Mary Dagworthy Yard James (August 7, 1810 – October 4, 1883) was an American hymnwriter.

Mary Dagworthy Yard was born in Trenton, New Jersey to a Quaker father and Baptist mother. She converted to Methodism as a child and began teaching Sunday school in the Methodist Episcopal church at the age of 13. In 1834, Yard married Henry B. James; and in 1853, she helped to found a home orphans. She became a leader in the Wesleyan Holiness Movement helping Phoebe Palmer, one of the founders of the movement; leading meetings; and writings roughly 50 hymns. She also wrote articles for publications such as Guide to Holiness, the New York Chris­tian Advocate, The Con­tribut­or, The Chris­tian Witness, The Chris­tian Woman, The Chris­tian Standard, and the Ocean Grove Record. She also wrote The Soul Winner in 1883.

James died on Oc­tober 4, 1883 in New York Ci­ty and is buried in her hometown of Tren­ton, New Jer­sey.

References

Further reading
 (introduction by James Monroe Buckley)

1810 births
1883 deaths
American hymnwriters
American women hymnwriters
Methodists from New Jersey
Methodist hymnwriters
People from Trenton, New Jersey